Katherine Rose Morley (born 3 October 1989) is an English actress who won the Graduate Student Gold award of 2012 as the Most Exceptional Performer at the Guildhall School of Music and Drama 2012. She has appeared in The Mill (2013–2014), Thirteen (2016), Last Tango in Halifax (2013–2020), Clink (2019) and The Syndicate (2021).

Early life
Morley was born in the Liverpool suburb of Woolton, on 3 October 1989. Her acting debut came at age 12 in a production of The Lion, the Witch and the Wardrobe at St Julie's Catholic High School in Woolton. Between the ages of 13 and 19, she spent time with Liverpool's Everyman and Playhouse Youth Theatre, partaking in the company's Everyword Festival. She later attended the Guildhall School of Music and Drama, where she won the institute's Gold Medal for Drama, a prestigious award given to one exceptional performer each year. She graduated with a BA in 2012. She also studied at the Chinese Central Academy of Drama in Beijing and the Italian Prima del Teatro in Pisa.

Career
Morley first appeared on television in 2012 in an episode of the comedy series Little Crackers. In 2013, she starred as Lucy Garner in the drama series The Mill.  In 2015, she made appearances in episodes of the drama series Vera and Cuffs. Also in 2015, she appeared in the short films Break alongside John Hurt and The Caravan with co-star Shirley Henderson. 

In 2016, she starred in episodes of the drama series Moving On and Call the Midwife. She starred as Emma Moxam in the 2016 drama miniseries Thirteen alongside Jodie Comer. She also had a regular role as Ellie in the drama series Last Tango in Halifax from 2013 to 2020. In 2021 she appeared in series 4 of the BBC comedy drama The Syndicate.

Filmography

Film

Television

Awards and nominations

References

External links
 
KRM instagram
Wild phase - Fishbowl: Comedy Feeds 2015 - BBC Three

1989 births
Living people
21st-century English actresses
Actresses from Liverpool
English film actresses
English television actresses
Alumni of the Guildhall School of Music and Drama
People from Woolton